The cycling competitions of the 2024 Summer Olympics in Paris are scheduled to run at four different venues (Pont d'Iéna for road and time trial races; Vélodrome de Saint-Quentin-en-Yvelines for track cycling and BMX racing; Élancourt Hill for mountain biking; and Place de la Concorde for the BMX freestyle) from 27 July to 11 August, featuring twenty-two events across five disciplines.

Cycling competitions have been contested in every Summer Olympics edition since the modern Olympiad revived in 1896, along with athletics, artistic gymnastics, fencing and swimming.

A total of 514 cyclists will compete at Paris 2024 with an equal split between men and women for the first time in the sport's history, attaining the goal of gender equality as one of the objectives ratified by the Union Cycliste Internationale (UCI). Having already been achieved in mountain biking, BMX racing, and BMX freestyle on the Tokyo 2020 program, several significant changes are instituted in the road and track cycling, with some men's quota places transferred to the women's side and with the number of riders in women's team sprint increasing from two to three. Conforming to the recommendations of the International Olympic Committee's 2020 agenda, cycling will have fourteen fewer places at these Games than those in 2020, a reduction that affects road racing and mountain biking. Nonetheless, the distribution of an extra place for track cycling and six in BMX freestyle, with the number of athletes competing in the men's and women's events increasing from nine to twelve, partly counteracts the moderate decrease in the cycling spots offered at these Games.

Despite the modest quota decrease, cycling will feature a total of twenty-two medal events across five disciplines, similar to the 2020 program format. While the sport continues to run on all days between the opening and closing ceremonies, Paris 2024 will witness some scheduling changes contrary to the previous edition; hence, the men's and women's individual time trial medalists will be awarded on the first day of the competition.

Qualification

As the host country, France reserves a men's and women's quota place in BMX racing, BMX freestyle, and mountain biking; and two more in the men's and women's road races. If one or two French cyclists qualify directly and regularly, their spare slots will be reallocated to the next highest-ranked eligible NOCs in the aforementioned events based on the national order of the UCI World Ranking list by October 17, 2023. 

About ninety percent of the total quota places will be attributed through the UCI World Ranking lists of their respective disciplines, with some spots offered for the cyclists at the 2023 UCI World Championships and at the continental qualification tournaments (Africa, Asia, and the Americas).

Competition schedule

Participating nations

Medalists

Medal table

Road cycling

Track cycling

Men's

Women's

Mountain biking

BMX

See also

Cycling at the 2022 Asian Games
Cycling at the 2022 Commonwealth Games
Cycling at the 2023 European Games
Cycling at the 2023 Pan American Games

References

 
2024 Summer Olympics events
2024
Olympics
Olympics
Cycle races in France